Chazz Witherspoon (born September 16, 1981) is an American former professional boxer. The second cousin of former boxing champion Tim Witherspoon, he emerged as a talented boxer in the 2000s. He won the 2004 National Golden Gloves finals in Kansas City, Missouri, and by collecting all wins via stoppage, he became the first man in the history of the Golden Gloves to win the National Title by all stoppages.

In 2008, holding a record of 23–0 with 14 KOs, he was set to fight fellow heavyweight prospect Chris Arreola to determine America's top heavyweight contender. Witherspoon lost the fight, and Arreola went on to challenge world champion Vitali Klitschko. After this defeat, he had three wins (all by knockout) before losing again, this time to Tony Thompson, in December 2009. He had four more wins (three by knockout) before suffering his third defeat, to Seth Mitchell, in a fight he was winning.

Witherspoon saw another title shot when he was set to fight former undisputed cruiserweight champion Oleksandr Usyk with just a few days' notice, after Tyrone Spong, Usyk's scheduled opponent, tested positive to a banned substance. 

Witherspoon came to the fight after a streak of 8 wins (6 by knockout) since his loss to Mitchell, having defeated Tyyab Beale, Cory Phelps, Galen Brown, Nick Guivas, Michael Marrone, Carlos Sandoval, Lamont Capers and Santander Silgado. Witherspoon lost the fight against Usyk as he retired in his corner after round 7.

Early life and education
Witherspoon was born the oldest of three children in Philadelphia, Pennsylvania to Eric Witherspoon. He attended Paulsboro High School, where he played basketball and graduated with a 4.0 GPA and as a member of the National Honor Society. Upon graduation, he was offered three NCAA Division I basketball scholarships and two track scholarships, but chose to instead accept a full academic scholarship at Saint Joseph's University. He graduated from Saint Joseph with a degree in pharmaceutical marketing in 2005.

Witherspoon's cousin Tim later introduced him to experienced boxing trainers Randy and Wade Hinnant, and both assisted and encouraged his development in the sport.

Amateur career
Witherspoon began his amateur boxing career in his sophomore year at Saint Joseph's University. A year later, Witherspoon won the Pennsylvania State Golden Gloves title. Five months later he placed third at the 2003 National Police Athletic League Tournament. Three months after that he won the Middle Atlantic Regional Tournament, qualifying him for the U.S. Championships and in the process was awarded the title of “Most Outstanding Boxer”.

He took second place at the 2004 U.S. Championships, which qualified him for the Olympic trials, where he advanced to the Olympic Box-offs but only made the Olympic team as an alternate.
 
Two months after returning from the Athens Olympics he won his second Pennsylvania Golden Gloves Title, thus advancing to the 2004 National Golden Gloves finals in Kansas City, Missouri which he won, all wins via stoppage. He is the first man in the history of the Golden Gloves to win the National Title by all stoppages.

His amateur record is 26 wins and 6 losses.

Professional career
Known as "The Gentleman", Witherspoon turned pro in 2004 and was undefeated for the first 23 of his professional bouts, winning 15 by KO.

Coming from a winning streak of 23 wins (15 by knockout), the undefeated Witherspoon was set to fight against Chris Arreola to determine the top heavyweight contender of America. Before the fight, Lou DiBella stated: "The winner [of Witherspoon vs Arreola] is clearly going to be the guy [who emerges as a top heavyweight contender]". HBO's Larry Merchant stated: "Witherspoon and Arreola clearly are the two most advanced, relatively unknown American heavyweights. The winner will emerge as the better of the two and immediately goes on the short list of U.S. contenders who could be in line to get a crack at one of the world titles in the relatively near future".

On June 21, 2008, Witherspoon lost the fight against fellow heavyweight prospect Chris Arreola in which he was disqualified in the third round. Arreola landed a barrage of punches that was capped off by a chopping right that sent Witherspoon to the canvas. The bell rang early in the count, prompting Witherspoon's corner to begin entering the ring. This was ruled by the referee to be a disqualification since the round is not technically over until the count is over.

Witherspoon in his next fight defeated Adam Richards by 8th-round TKO, in an action packed fight which received Ring Magazine's 2008 Heavyweight Fight Of the year.

Witherspoon next fought Travis Fulton and Willie Perryman, defeating both of them by knockout. He then suffered the second defeat of his career at the hands of Tony Thompson, losing by TKO in the ninth round. He then defeated Livin Castillo in Atlantic City, New Jersey, on August 28, 2010. Three months later, on November 19, 2010, he defeated Alexis Mejias, also in Atlantic City. Witherspoon had two more wins (both by knockout) before suffering his third defeat, being defeated by Seth Mitchell in a fight Witherspoon was winning. Witherspoon next had a winning streak of 8 victories (six by knockout), overcoming Tyyab Beale, Cory Phelps, Galen Brown, Nick Guivas, Michael Marrone, Carlos Sandoval, Lamont Capers and Santander Silgado.

Witherspoon vs. Usyk
Witherspoon saw another title shot when he was set to fight former undisputed cruiserweight champion and future unified WBA (Super), IBF, WBO and IBO heavyweight champion Oleksandr Usyk. Usyk had been set to debut in the heavyweight division on October 12, 2019, at the Wintrust Arena, Chicago, Illinois, against Tyrone Spong. However, Spong tested positive for clomiphene, a banned substance, just a few days before the bout. The promoter Eddie Hearn announced that several backup fighters were being considered among whom Witherspoon was chosen. Thus, Witherspoon joined the fight with a few days' notice.

Eventually Usyk won the fight as Witherspoon retired in his corner after round 7.

Professional boxing record

References

External links
Official Website

Video Clips

1981 births
Living people
Boxers from Philadelphia
Heavyweight boxers
National Golden Gloves champions
American male boxers